Kariel is a given name and a surname. Notable people known by this name include the following:

Given name
Kariel Gardosh, known by his nickname Dosh, (1921 – 2000), Israeli cartoonist and illustrator

Surname
Henry Kariel (1924 – 2004), American political scientist and author

See also

Karel (given name)
Karel (surname)
Karie (name)
Kartel (disambiguation)
Kriel (disambiguation)

}